The ISD–Jorbi Continental Team were a Ukrainian UCI Continental cycling team. The team rode in senior professional events in Europe, other than the Grand Tours and UCI World Tour races.

The team disbanded at the end of the 2017 season.

Doping
In August 2015, Ukrainian Anatoliy Budyak tested positive for Mesocarb.

2017 team roster

Major wins 

2008
La Roue Tourangelle, Vitaly Kondrut
Stage 4 Le Triptyque des Monts et Châteaux, Yuriy Agarkov
Stage 2 Flèche du Sud, Denys Kostyuk
2009
Overall Tour of Szeklerland, Vitaliy Popkov
Stage 1, Vitaliy Popkov
2010
 Road Race Championships, Vitaliy Popkov
 Time Trial Championships, Vitaliy Popkov
Omloop van het Waasland, Denis Flahaut
Grand Prix de Denain, Denis Flahaut
GP Donetsk, Vitaliy Popkov
Overall GP Adygeya, Vitaliy Popkov
Prologue & Stage 3, Vitaliy Popkov
Stage 1, Oleksandr Sheydyk
Stage 3 Five Rings of Moscow, Vitaliy Popkov
Tallinn-Tartu GP, Denis Flahaut
Rogaland GP, Vitaliy Popkov
Stage 1 Tour of Szeklerland, Vitaliy Popkov
Stages 3 & 4a Tour of Szeklerland, Oleksandr Sheydyk
Stage 4b Tour of Szeklerland, Yuriy Agarkov
Stage 3 Tour des Pyrénées, Oleksandr Sheydyk
2011
GP Donetsk, Yuriy Agarkov
Stages 2 & 5 GP of Adygeya, Oleksandr Martynenko
GP of Moscow, Oleksandr Martynenko
Stage 2 Sibiu Cycling Tour, Maksym Vasilyev
2012
Stage 1 GP of Sochi, Anatoliy Pakthusov
Grand Prix of Moscow, Vitaliy Popkov
Race Horizon Park, Vitaliy Popkov
Stage 3 Tour of Romania, Maksym Vasilyev
Stage 6 Course de la Solidarité Olympique, Vitaliy Popkov
Stage 4 (ITT) Dookoła Mazowsza, Vitaliy Popkov
Overall Tour of Szeklerland, Vitaliy Popkov
Stage 2, Anatoliy Pakhtusov
2013
Stage 1 Grand Prix of Sochi, Vitaliy Popkov
Grand Prix of Donetsk, Anatoliy Pakhtusov
Stage 2 Grand Prix of Adygeya, Vitaliy Popkov
Stage 3 Azerbaijan International Cycling Tour, Vitaliy Popkov
Overall Course de la Solidarité Olympique, Vitaliy Popkov
Stage 1, Vitaliy Popkov
Stage 3 (ITT) Tour of Szeklerland, Vitaliy Popkov
2014
Stage 6 Grand Prix of Sochi, Maksym Vasilyev
2017
Minsk Cup, Yegor Dementyev

References

External links

UCI Continental Teams (Europe)
Defunct cycling teams based in Ukraine
Cycling teams established in 2006
Cycling teams disestablished in 2017
2006 establishments in Ukraine
2017 disestablishments in Ukraine